Todoroki (written: 轟 or 轟木 or 等々力) is a Japanese surname. Notable people with the surname include:

, Japanese sailor
, Japanese politician
, Japanese actress
, Japanese actress
, Japanese swordsman and kokugakusha

Fictional characters
, protagonist of the anime series Chō Soku Henkei Gyrozetter
, a character in the manga series Servamp
, a character in the manga series Ace of Diamond
, a character in the manga series My Hero Academia
Shu Todoroki, a character in the film Cars 2
, a character in the manga series Working!!

See also
Todoroki Station (disambiguation), multiple railway stations in Japan

Japanese-language surnames